The Eastern Cincinnati Conference (ECC) is an Ohio high school athletic conference in the eastern Cincinnati area, part of the Southwestern Ohio Region. The ECC consists of ten high schools: Anderson, Kings, Loveland, Milford, Turpin, Walnut Hills, West Clermont,  Lebanon,  Little Miami, and Winton Woods. Each of these schools compete in a variety of OHSA Division 1 and Division 2 Fall, Winter, and Spring sports. Lebanon, Little Miami, and Winton Woods joined in 2020-2021 school year. Withrow was a member school beginning with the 2014–2015 school year, but withdrew effective 2020–2021 school year to rejoin the Cincinnati Metropolitan Athletic Conference.

Fall sports 
The ECC officially recognizes the following as Fall sports: boys and girls cross country, boys football, boys and girls soccer, girls volleyball, girls tennis, and boys and girls golf.

Football 
Football is one of the more competitive sports in the ECC, with games taking place on Friday nights during football season, usually late August to early November, depending on how far the team advances in the playoffs. In 2012, the first season the ECC existed, Turpin dominated the conference with a 10–0 regular season record, and only losing their first game in the regional finals. Kings came second in the conference that year with a 6–4 overall record and a 4–2 conference record.

In the 2013 season, Loveland was a clear powerhouse with their 15–0 overall record. Loveland won all of their 10 regular season games, then continued on to win the Ohio Division 2 State Championship. Loveland won 9 of 10 regular season games by a margin of at least 28 points. Kings was the conference runner-up, dropping their only conference game to Loveland.

With the addition of Withrow to the conference in 2014, teams would now play 7 conference games in the regular season. Kings went 7–0 in the conference, moving on to the regional semifinals. Kings was able to win the rivalry game against Loveland, which was their only conference loss in the prior year. Loveland finished number 2 in the standings.

The 2015 season ended with Turpin and Kings as the Leaders, both ending the regular season with a 9–1 record. In the post-season regional semi-finals, Kings defeated Turpin to advance in the playoffs.

Soccer 
Soccer for the schools in the ECC has been one of the more successful competitive sports for both boys and girls, long before the ECC was formed. Turpin and Walnut Hills have had a history of success in their soccer programs, with Turpin winning 7 combined State Champion titles since the 1980s in boys and girls soccer. Turpin boys soccer is respected as one of the best teams in Ohio, having only lost 2 conference games since becoming a member of the ECC. The conference champion title for boys soccer has bounced back and forth between Walnut Hills and Turpin since the ECC formed in 2012. For girls soccer, the champion has shifted from Milford in 2012, to Loveland for the next two years, and most recently Turpin in the 2015 season.

Cross Country 
Cross Country is another sport with both boys and girls teams that compete in the ECC. In cross country, schools will send their runners to meets, where they compete for the fastest completion of a 5-kilometer race (referred to as a 5K run). For boys cross country, all schools except Withrow have boys competing in varsity cross country. Casey Gallagher from Anderson set the ECC boys cross country record for the 5K run in 2012 at 15 minutes 56 seconds during the Trinity Meet. A close second was made Alaeldin Tirba from Turpin with a 15-minute 59.70-second run. Since then, nobody in the ECC has gotten under the 16:00 mark at an official 5K run. In the 2015 season, there were 192 runners in the ECC, with the fastest 5K run time going to Nick Stone (Anderson), with a 16:19 time. Girls Cross Country also competes in ECC 5K races, with Walnut Hills or Turpin winning the 5K run fastest time of all four seasons. The fastest girls 5K run in ECC history was set in the 2015 season with an 18:28 time by Samantha Bush (Turpin) at the Ross Meet.

Winter sports

Bowling 
Bowling is another sport with boys and girls teams that compete in matches and the highest score wins. To determine who wins the ECC is standings. All teams in the ECC do bowling except Withrow. Girls bowling, 2012 Glen Este has been crowned champions in 2012 all the way to 2016. The 2016–17 champions of the ECC was clinched by Glen Este & Milford. In 2017–18 Milford clinched the ECC title. In 2018–19 West Clermont clinched the ECC title. In 2019–20, Loveland got its first title and captured the ECC title. For the 2020 girls statistics, Lexi Stewart, West Clermont was the leader with an average of 191.9. For the boys bowling, Glen Este has had 6 title wins, while Loveland has 1, Anderson has 2, and Kings has 1. For the 2019–20 season the boys' leader is Jarryd Forthuber, West Clermont with an average of 222.7.

References 
 ^http://eccsports.com/index.aspx

Ohio high school sports conferences